The Roman Catholic Diocese of Mao–Monte Cristi (erected 16 January 1978) is a suffragan diocese of the Archdiocese of Santiago de los Caballeros.

Ordinaries
Jerónimo Tomás Abreu Herrera (1978 - 2006) 
Diómedes Antonio Espinal de León (2006 - )

External links and references

Mao-Monte Cristi
Mao-Monte Cristi
Mao-Monte Cristi
Mao-Monte Cristi, Roman Catholic Diocese of